Udekwesiri Odilora was a Nigerian novelist and secondary school teacher.
He is mostly known as the writer of Oka Aku Eri Eri one of the foremost novels in Igbo literature.

Life and career 
Odilora was born in Umunachi in Dunukofia local government area of Anambra state. He studied French at the University of Nigeria, Nsukka. He was a secondary school teacher by profession until retirement.

References 

Nigerian novelists
Igbo novelists
Igbo-language writers